Peter Kalifornsky (October 12, 1911 – June 5, 1993) was a writer and ethnographer of the Dena'ina Athabaskan of Kenai, Alaska.

Early life, family and education
He was the great-grandson of Qadanalchen, who took the name Kalifornsky after working in the Russian American colony of Fort Ross in California. (Kalifornsky, Alaska was named for him.)

Career
Kalifornsky wrote traditional stories, poems, and language lessons in the Outer Inlet dialect (sometimes called the Kenai dialect) of Dena'ina, a language of the Athabaskan language group. As a Dena'ina elder, Kalifornsky participated in creating the written version of the Dena'ina language. Over 19 years, he worked to record as many sukdu (traditional stories) as he could remember, translating them also into English. He also wrote original works in Dena'ina, including a number of autobiographical works.

Near the end of his life, he worked with linguist James Kari of the Alaska Native Language Center and anthropologist Alan Boraas of Kenai Peninsula College to compile his collected works.  Published in 1991, A Dena'ina Legacy — K'tl'egh'i Sukdu: The Collected Writings of Peter Kalifornsky contains 147 bilingual Dena'ina-English writings.  Throughout most of the volume, the original Dena'ina appears on the left-hand page and the English translation appears opposite, on the right page.

Works by Peter Kalifornsky

This bibliography is based upon “Kalifornskyana,” the bibliography of Kalifornsky's works included in A Dena'ina Legacy.  However, the bibliography has been reordered and citations are rendered in a different citation style.  As with the original bibliography, materials not included in A Dena'ina Legacy are marked with a cross † — here placed after the date. A double-cross ‡ is used for one item from which most but not all materials are included in A Dena'ina Legacy.

Published works

Books

 1977; revised 1981. Kahtnuht’ana Qenaga: The Kenai People’s Language. Ed. by James Kari.  Fairbanks, AK: Alaska Native Language Center, University of Alaska Fairbanks, 140 pages.
 1984.  K’tl’egh’i Sukdu: Remaining Stories.  Ed. by Jane McGary and James Kari.  Fairbanks, AK: Alaska Native Language Center, University of Alaska Fairbanks, 124 pages.
 1991.  A Dena’ina Legacy — K’tl’egh’i Sukdu: The Collected Writings of Peter Kalifornsky.  Ed. by James Kari and Alan Boraas.  Fairbanks, Alaska: Alaska Native Language Center, University of Alaska Fairbanks.

Shorter works

 1974.  K’eła Sukdu, The Mouse Story. Fairbanks, AK: Alaska Native Language Center, University of Alaska Fairbanks. 7 pages.
 1974.  Ch’enlahi Sukdu, The Gambling Story.  Fairbanks, AK: Alaska Native Language Center, University of Alaska Fairbanks.  11 pages.
 1975. “The Lord’s Prayer.”  Orthodox Alaska 5:51.
 1975. “Qunshi Uquch’el’ani, Beluga Hunting.”  In James Kari, ed., Dena’ina T’qit’ach’: The Way the Tanaina Are.  Fairbanks, AK: Alaska Native Language Center, University of Alaska Fairbanks, pp. 16–18.
 1976. [Dena’ina numbers.]  [Page numbers handwritten in Dena’ina by Peter Kalifornsky on each page.]  In Walt and Elsa Pederson, eds, A Small History of the Western Kenai.  Chicago: Adams Press.
 1977.  “Low Bush Cranberry Story.”  In Priscilla Russell Kari, Dena’ina K’et’una, Tanaina Plantlore.  Anchorage: Adult Literacy Laboratory, p. 42.
 1980.‡  Five Legends of the Dena’ina People.  Told by Peter Kalifornsky, written and edited by June Lindgren Gagnon.  Kenai, AK: Cook Inlet Native Association. 48 pages. [Note: four of these stories are included in A Dena'ina Legacy; the fifth story, "The Spirit of the Bear," was not written in Dena'ina by Kalifornsky.]
 1980.  “A View of the Effects of Exploration on Alaska Natives.”  In Antoinette Shalkop, ed., Exploration in Alaska: Captain Cook Commemorative Lecture Series.  Anchorage, AK: Cook Inlet Historical Society, pp. 197–199.
 1981.†  “The Potlatch Song of the Lonely Man,” modified version.  In Lance Petersen, The Ballad of Kenai [play].
 1982. Translator (English to Dena’ina), Qezdceghnen Ggagga, The Kustatan Bear Story by Maxim Chickalusion.  Fairbanks, AK: Alaska Native Language Center, University of Alaska Fairbanks.  33 pages.
 1982.  [Two gambling songs.]  In James Kari, ed., Ch’enlahi, the Tep-Wi Hand Game of the Dena’ina.  Kenai, AK: Kenai Borough School District, pp. 18–19.
 1983.  “Unhshcheyakda: My Great-Great-Grandfather.”  In James Kari, Kalifornsky, The Californian from Cook Inlet.  Alaska in Perspective 5(1): 8.
 1983.  “The Potlatch Song of the Lonely Man.”  In Richard K. Nelson, The Athabaskans: People of the Boreal Forest.  Fairbanks, AK: University of Alaska Museum.
 1985.  “The Mouse Story,” “The Gambling Story,” “Crow and the One-Side Human,” “The Old Dena’ina Beliefs.”  Alaska Quarterly Review 4(3–4): 173-181.  [Special issue on Alaska Native Writers, Storytellers, and Orators.]
 1990.  “Two Cook Inlet Dena’ina Narratives About Russians.”  In Richard Pierce, ed., Russia in North America, Proceedings of the Second International Conference on Russian-America.  Kingston, Ontario: The Limestone Press, pp. 36–40.

Unpublished works and manuscripts

 1972.  Notes on a 1972 Kenai potlatch.  Unpublished manuscript, 4 pages.
 1974.†  Notebook #1 [writing practice].  Handwritten manuscript, 34 pages.
 1974.†  Schoolbook translations for State Operated Schools.  Handwritten manuscript, 7 pages.
 1974–1976.†  Writings and lesson materials.  Handwritten and typed manuscript, about 50 pages.
 1974–1991.†  Correspondence.  Dena’ina and English.  About 50 pages.
 1974, 2004.†  Kenai Dena'ina Key Words.  Manuscript, 6 pages.
 1980.†  A trip to California and New Mexico.  Handwritten manuscript, 14 pages.
 1985–1987.  Dena’ina stories in manuscript.  Typescript, 56 pages.  (Retyped copies of 66 published stories from 1977 and 1984; Dena’ina only, no English translations).
 1985–1987.  New stories and texts.  Typescript, 46 pages. [55 items mainly in Dena’ina, without English.]

Posthumous Editions 
Peter Kalifornsky and Katherine McNamara, From the First Beginning. When the Animals Were Talking / Ninya Hndadulghest: The Dena'ina Animal Stories of Peter Kalifornsky and Conversations with the Author. (Charlottesville, VA: Artist's Proof Editions, 2015). (Apple Books)

Peter Kalifornsky and Katherine McNamara, Kel Ench'q Ghe'uyi Lachq'u Niltu / From the Believing Time, When they Tested for the Truth: The Dana'ina Belief Stories of Peter Kalifornsky. (Charlottesville, VA: Artist's Proof Editions, 2019). (Apple Books)

Video

 1984.† “Narrowing Down to One Best Path.”  Videotaped poetry reading by Peter Kalifornsky and Gary Snyder, Kenai Peninsula College, April 9, 1984.  [Includes Snyder’s comments on Peter Kalifornsky and Peter Kalifornsky reading a selection of his writings in Dena’ina and English.]

Interviews

McNamara, Katherine.  (1985).†  “A Talk with Peter Kalifornsky: Sukdu Beq’ Quht’ana Ch’ulani, The Stories Are for Us to Learn Something From.”  Alaska Quarterly Review 4(3–4): 199-208.  [Special issue on Alaska Native Writers, Storytellers, and Orators.]
 McClanahan, A. J., ed.  (1986).†  “Peter Kalifornsky, Kalifornsky Village (an interview).”  In Our Stories, Our Lives.  Anchorage, AK: CIRI Foundation, pp. 23–32.

See also
 Athabaskan
 Dena'ina (tribe)
 Dena'ina language
 Kalifornsky village, Alaska

Footnotes

References

 Anchorage Daily News.  (1993-06-09).  “Obituaries” (obituary of Peter Kalifornsky). Anchorage Daily News, p. E3.
 Boraas, Alan. (1975). "Report on the 1975 Excavations at the Kalifornsky Village Site, Kenai Peninsula, Alaska." Unpublished manuscript in author's files.
 Boraas, Alan S.  (1991).  “Peter Kalifornsky: A Biography.”  In Kalifornsky, 1991, pp. 470–481.
 Boraas, Alan S.  (2004-12-25).  “Find Renewal by Defining Your Purpose.”  Anchorage Daily News, p. B6.
 Hulen, David. (1989-05-28). “Kenai Tribe is Invisible No Longer.” Anchorage Daily News, p. A1.
 Hymes, Dell. (1991).  “Foreword.”  In Kalifornsky, 1991, pp. xvi–xix.
 Kalifornsky, Peter.  (1991).  A Dena’ina Legacy — K’tl’egh’i Sukdu: The Collected Writings of Peter Kalifornsky.  Ed. by James Kari and Alan Boraas.  Fairbanks, AK: Alaska Native Language Center, University of Alaska Fairbanks.
 Kari, James. (1975). "A Classification of Tanaina Dialects." Anthropological Papers of the University of Alaska 17(2): 49-53.
 Kari, James. (1991a). “Writing at the Archaic Periphery.”  In Kalifornsky, 1991, pp. xxiii–xxx.
 Kari, James. (1991b). “Introduction to the Kustatan Bear.”  In Kalifornsky, 1991, pp. 287–289.
 Kari, James, and Alan Boraas. (1991). “Kalifornskyana” [bibliography].  In Kalifornsky, 1991, pp. xxixii–xxxiv.
 Kari, Priscilla Russell.  (1995).  Tanaina Plantlore, Dena'ina K'et'una, 4th ed.  Fairbanks, AK: Alaska Native Language Center, Alaska Natural History Association, and National Park Service. [First edition published 1977 by Adult Literary Laboratory, University of Alaska Anchorage.]
 Kizzia, Tom. (1991-10-14). “Last Testament ‘A Dena’ina Legacy:’ At 80, Peter Kalifornsky Gives a Collected Treasure of Alaska Language and Living.” Anchorage Daily News, p. A1.
 Kizzia, Tom. (1991-12-16). “The Invisible People The Good Land: Competing Myths Shroud Arrival of Russian Traders.” Anchorage Daily News, p. A1.
 Kizzia, Tom. (1991-12-19). “The Invisible People: In Kalifornsky Village Dena’ina Find a Measure of Past and Peace.” Anchorage Daily News, p. A1.
 Kizzia, Tom. (1991-12-24). “Kenai Puts Time Capsule in Center.” Anchorage Daily News, p. B2.
 Kizzia, Tom. (1993-06-07). “Kenaitze Elder, Storyteller Dies: Peter Kalifornsky Nursed Old Ways.” Anchorage Daily News, p. A1.
 Kizzia, Tom. (1993-06-10). “Dena’ina Elder Buried in Once-Lost Cemetery.” Anchorage Daily News, p. A1.
 Little, Jon. (1998-08-07). “Borough Might Return Village to Tribe.” Anchorage Daily News, p. B1.
 Little, Jon.  (2002-06-28).  “Diggin’ history — Kenaitze youths help archaeology students.”  Anchorage Daily News, p. A1.
 Loshbaugh, Doug. (2000-03-05). "Digging the Past."  Peninsula Clarion.  Retrieved on 2007-02-26.
 McNamara, Katherine.  (1985).  “A Talk with Peter Kalifornsky: Sukdu beq’ quht’ana ch’ulani, The Stories Are for Us to Learn Something From.”  Alaska Quarterly Review 4(3–4): 179-208.  [Special issue on Alaska Native Writers, Storytellers, and Orators.]
 O’Harra, Doug. (1999-09-05). “Scraping for Clues of a Dena’ina Past.” We Alaskans (Sunday magazine of Anchorage Daily News), p. G5.
 Znamenski, Andrei A., trans. (2003). Through Orthodox Eyes: Russian Missionary Narratives of Travels to the Dena'ina and Ahtna, 1850s–1930s.  Rasmuson Library Historical Translation Series, vol. 13.  Fairbanks, AK: University of Alaska Press. Includes a 72-page introduction by Znamenski.

1911 births
1993 deaths
20th-century American writers
Denaʼina
Alaskan Athabaskan people
American ethnographers
Native American writers
People from Kenai Peninsula Borough, Alaska
Writers from Alaska
Linguists of Na-Dene languages
American Book Award winners
20th-century American male writers